Andrea Navagero (Venice, 1483 – Blois, 8 May 1529) was an Italian poet, orator, botanist, and official historian of the Republic of Venice. 

He was born to a noble family of Venice, and became a member of the Maggior Consiglio in 1504. He studied classical literature and languages in Venice and Padua. In Venice, he worked with the publishing house (Aldina or Aldine Press) and academy established by Manuzio, but for a few decades after 1515, run by Andrea Torresano. Navagero was much in demand for writing elegies of famous individuals, including Caterina Cornaro, Marcantonio Coccio Sabellico, Doge Leonardo Loredan, and Giovanni Jacopo Trivulzio. He aided the Aldine press in the publication of codicils of classic authors such as Cicero, Ovid, Virgil, Quintilian, and Lucretius. He was buried in San Martino in Murano.

References

Further reading 

 Cicogna, Emmaneule Antonio, Delle iscrizioni veneziane raccolte ed illustrate, 1825-1859, vols. I-VI, Venezia, G. Orlandelli (later G. Picotti, later G. Molinari, later Tipografia Andreola (see specifically vol. VI, pp. 169–348 for Navagero)
 Elwert, Theodor W., Pietro Bembo e la vita letteraria del suo tempo in La civiltà veneziana del Rinascimento, 1958, Firenze, Sansoni, pp. 125–176 (see specifically pp. 142–143 for Navagero)

External links
 

1483 births
1529 deaths
16th-century Italian botanists
16th-century Italian poets
16th-century male writers
Italian male poets
Pre-Linnaean botanists